Sota Okamura (born 4 February 1977) is a Japanese ski jumper.

In the World Cup his highest place was number 19 from January 2001 in Sapporo.

External links

1977 births
Living people
Japanese male ski jumpers
Sportspeople from Sapporo